Albert Lincoln Roker Jr. (born August 20, 1954) is an American weather presenter, journalist, television personality, and author. He is the current weather anchor on NBC's Today, and occasionally co-hosts 3rd Hour Today. He has an inactive American Meteorological Society Television Seal #238.

Early life
Roker was born in the borough of Queens, New York City, the son of Isabel, of Jamaican descent, and Albert Lincoln Roker Sr., a bus driver of Bahamian descent. He initially wanted to be a cartoonist. He was raised Catholic, his mother's faith, and graduated from Xavier High School in Manhattan.  He attended the State University of New York at Oswego where he received a B.A. in communications in 1976.

Career

Early career (1974–95)
Roker worked as a weather anchor for CBS affiliate WHEN-TV (now WTVH) in Syracuse, New York from 1974 until 1976, while he was enrolled at SUNY Oswego. During his time in Oswego, he also DJ'd at the campus radio station, WNYO. Following the completion of his studies, Roker moved to Washington, D.C. and took a weathercasting position at independent station WTTG, then owned by Metromedia, remaining there for much of the next two years.

Roker's career with NBC began in 1978 when he was hired at WKYC in Cleveland, then an NBC owned-and-operated station. After five years in Cleveland, Roker was promoted to the network's flagship outlet, WNBC-TV in his hometown.  Roker returned to New York City in late 1983 as a weekend weathercaster, and within eight months became the station's regular weeknight weathercaster.  Roker replaced 27-year WNBC-TV veteran Dr. Frank Field, who left the network over a contract dispute.  From 1983 to 1996, Roker was the regular substitute for forecaster Joe Witte on the NBC News program NBC News at Sunrise, and from 1990 to 1995 filled in for Willard Scott, Bryant Gumbel and 1997 through 2000's for Matt Lauer on the Today Show. In 1995, he became the host of The Al Roker Show, a weekend talk show on CNBC.

Roker received wider exposure when David Letterman asked him to join in an elevator race on an episode of the talk show Late Night with David Letterman, which taped across the hall from the WNBC news studio in the GE Building. This led to Roker becoming the forecaster for Weekend Today. He also substituted on the weekday edition of Today when Willard Scott was ill or away.

Full time on the Today show (1996–present)
In early 1996, Scott announced his semi-retirement from Today. On January 26, 1996, Roker received the regular weekday weather slot. Roker's studio remote forecasts, interviewing visitors outside and giving them some camera time, became a staple. Roker conducted more interviews and segments on the show over time. He continues the daily tradition of birthday wishes to centenarians that began with Scott.

In 2005, Roker reported from inside Hurricane Wilma. A popular viral video shows him swept off his feet by the fierce wind and clinging to the cameraman.

In addition to his role as Today Show weather man and anchor, Roker co-hosted the third hour of Today called Today's Take, beginning November 12, 2012. Today's Take was cancelled in February 2017 for Megyn Kelly Today and aired its final episode on September 22, 2017. After Megyn Kelly Today was cancelled in 2018, Roker returned to co-host 3rd Hour Today.

During the 2013 inauguration of Barack Obama, Roker received a handshake from Joe Biden. Years later, as an NBC News reporter at Biden's own 2021 inauguration, Roker received a fist bump from the newly inaugurated president moments before Biden entered the White House.

In November 2014, Roker embarked on a "Rokerthon", in which he did a non-stop, 34-hour weather forecast on NBC, from 10:05 p.m. on November 12, 2014, until about 8:00 a.m. on November 14, 2014. The record-setting event was a fundraiser for the Crowdrise Campaign to benefit the military and USO. He held a "Rokerthon 2", this time reporting weather from all 50 states and Washington, D.C. during the week from November 6 to November 13, 2015, in support of Feeding America. From March 27 until March 31, 2017, he embarked on "Rokerthon 3", visiting colleges and setting a Guinness World Record at each one, such as the longest conga line on ice and largest human letter.

Other work
Roker has hosted NBC's coverage of the Macy's Thanksgiving Day Parade since 1995 (with the exception of 2022), where he provides commentary along with some of his Today Show colleagues. He is known as the "uptown" host, whose main roles include cutting the ribbon during the ribbon-cutting ceremony at the start of the parade, and interviewing celebrities who are watching the parade from its start at 77th Street. Roker was unable to host the coverage of the parade in 2022 after recovering from blood clots that had led to being hospitalized.

Roker is a game show fan. From 1996 to 1997, he hosted a game show on MSNBC called Remember This?. He substituted for Meredith Vieira for a week of Who Wants to Be a Millionaire shows from March 5–9, 2007.

In 2008, Roker hosted NBC's Celebrity Family Feud. 
He hosted a week-long feature on Today profiling five game shows and their hosts in July 2016 titled "Game On Today". He has appeared as a celebrity player on both Merv Griffin game shows Jeopardy! and Wheel of Fortune.

Roker has hosted programs on Food Network, namely, Roker on the Road, and Tricked-Out Tailgating. He is also an avid barbecue enthusiast.

Roker provided forecasts for several radio stations, including the New York smooth jazz radio station WQCD (101.9 FM) and for Cleveland smooth jazz station WNWV (107.3 FM), through a service called the "Al Roker Radio Weather Network", distributed by United Stations Radio Networks. It has since been replaced by Accuweather.
He also had a one and a half hour weekday morning stint live from 5:00–7:00 a.m. on The Weather Channel under the name Wake Up with Al which aired from 2009 until 2015.

It was announced on September 5, 2018, that Roker would portray Joe in the Broadway musical Waitress for a six-week run from October 5 to November 11. He later returned to the show for a limited run from November 1 to 24, 2019.

Author

Writing with Dick Lochte, Roker co-authored a series of murder mysteries beginning in 2009 that feature Billy Blessing, a celebrity chef turned amateur detective. The second book in the series, The Midnight Show Murders (2010), was nominated for 
a 2011 Nero Award. The Morning Show Murders, also published in 2010, was made into the 2018 movie on Hallmark Movies and Mysteries with Holly Robinson Peete in the lead role.

In 2016, the non-fiction book Been There, Done That: Family Wisdom for Modern Times, written by Roker and his wife Deborah Roberts, was published.

Personal life
Following an early marriage and divorce, Roker married  WNBC producer Alice Bell in December 1984. He and Bell adopted daughter Courtney as an infant in 1987. Roker and Bell later divorced. Roker married TV journalist Deborah Roberts on September 16, 1995. They are the parents of daughter Leila (born November 17, 1998) and son Nicholas (born July 18, 2002).

On November 7, 2010, Roker ran in the ING New York City Marathon.

Roker is an honorary member of the Phi Beta Sigma fraternity.

On May 10, 2021, Roker returned to his former stomping grounds in Cleveland to report on the city's reopening efforts following the COVID-19 pandemic, and while live on the Today Show, WKYC chief meteorologist Betsy Kling announced that the station had named the radar tower on top of the WKYC building the "Roker Tower" in his honor, and presented Roker a plaque to commemorate the occasion.

Health

On Thursday, June 7, 2001, Roker underwent a total knee arthoplasty (replacement, or "TKA") on his left knee.

In 2002, Roker underwent gastric bypass surgery to lose weight, which he said he did after failing at numerous diets. Eight months after the surgery, the New York Daily News reported he had dropped  from his  figure. Roker wrote about his battle with weight loss in Never Goin' Back: Winning the Weight Loss Battle For Good, published in 2013.

In 2005, he had a back operation. He had another knee replacement surgery in 2016.

In October 2018, Roker underwent emergency carpal tunnel surgery.

In September 2019, he had a hip replacement surgery.

In November 2020, he revealed he was diagnosed with prostate cancer in September 2020. He had a successful operation on November 9, and by November 17 he was at home recovering.

In November 2022, after being absent from Today for a few days, Roker revealed he was in the hospital being treated for blood clots in his lungs. He returned to the show on January 6, 2023, revealing he also suffered from internal bleeding, which necessitated surgery, two bleeding ulcers, colon resection surgery, when part or all of the colon is removed, and gallbladder removal surgery.  Roker credits his wife and NewYork-Presbyterian physicians and staff for saving his life.

Charity work

In 2007, Roker became an official supporter of Ronald McDonald House Charities and is a member of their celebrity board, called the Friends of RMHC. He also served as the official spokesperson for Amtrak's National Train Day, which took place on May 10, 2008.

Controversy

2012 Olympic logo controversy

The following day Roker stated, "I started joking about [the logo]. I want to make this clear—I was not joking about epilepsy or anyone who suffers from epilepsy. We understand and know that this is a serious affliction and would never joke about that. We were joking about the logo—not about epilepsy. If anybody was offended, I heartily and really humbly apologize."

Cab driver
On November 23, 2015, Roker alleged racial discrimination and filed a complaint after he and his son attempted to hail a cab. The cab driver reportedly had passed them in order to pick up a white man on the next block. Roker stated on Twitter that a "cabbie picked up a white guy a block away. Wonder why Uber wins?" According to the New York City Taxi and Limousine Commission, the driver would either have to pay a $500 fine or possibly have his license suspended.

Signature phrases
 Roker often says "That's what's going on around the country, here's what's happening in your neck of the woods" when transitioning from the national weather broadcast to the local affiliate.
 On many occasions on Today he has used the phrase "man candy" to describe attractive males.
 When he mentions Sunday's weather forecast on weekdays, often he repeats the word "Sunday", imitating the drag racing promotional catchphrase.
 During Macy's Thanksgiving Day Parade ribbon cutting ceremonies, he is joined by the producers of the parade or the CEO of Macy's and special guests in kicking off the parade with the countdown "5, 4, 3, 2, 1. Let's have a parade!"

Other appearances and activities
 On the May 9, 1998, episode of Saturday Night Live (hosted by David Duchovny), Roker appeared in a "Mango" sketch with Matt Lauer.  The typical Mango sketch involved a person becoming obsessed with Mango, a character portrayed by cast member Chris Kattan.
 Roker voiced a caricature of himself as a faustian figure in two episodes of the animated Disney Channel series The Proud Family, a role he reprised in the Disney+ revival, The Proud Family: Louder and Prouder.
 During the first inaugural parade of President Barack Obama, Al Roker obtained the "first interview" with the new president by waving his fedora hat and yelling to the walking Obama to come over.  Acknowledging Roker, the perambulating president continued on, telling him "it's warm!"
 Roker holds the record for most appearances on Late Night with Conan O'Brien, with over 30. He would often appear on the show as a last-minute replacement if a previously scheduled guest canceled their appearance.
 Roker makes a cameo appearance as the honorary Orange Wiggle in The Wiggles song, "Thank You, Mr. Weatherman" on their 2011 release "Ukulele, Baby!"
 Roker had a cameo appearance in Sharknado 2: The Second One, which premiered on Syfy on July 30, 2014.
 He reprised the cameo in the sequels Sharknado 3: Oh Hell No!, which premiered on July 22, 2015, Sharknado: The 4th Awakens, which premiered on July 31, 2016, Sharknado 5: Global Swarming in 2017, and The Last Sharknado: It's About Time in 2018.
 Roker appeared as the guest ring announcer at WrestleMania 33, for the match between John Cena and Nikki Bella, versus The Miz and Maryse.
 In 2014, Commandant of the Coast Guard Admiral Robert Papp named Roker an honorary commodore in the United States Coast Guard Auxiliary. Roker had produced and narrated a Coast Guard documentary television series.
 In 2018, Roker appeared in episode 400 of My Brother, My Brother, and Me
 In 2018, Roker appeared in the Hallmark television movie Morning Show Mysteries: Mortal Mishaps based on the book series he co-authored.
 In 2019, Roker appeared in the Hallmark television movie Morning Show Mysteries: Death by Design based on the book series he co-authored.
 In 2022, Roker would make a cameo in a season 47 Please Don't Destroy sketch on SNL alongside actor Paul Rudd and writers Martin Herelily, John Higgins and Ben Marshall.

Filmography

Works
 2000: Don't Make Me Stop This Car! reflections on fatherhood 
 2013: Never Goin' Back: Winning the Weight-Loss Battle For Good 
 2016: Been There, Done That: Family Wisdom for Modern Times co-written with his wife Deborah Roberts. 

Billy Blessing novels
 2009: The Morning Show Murders. Co-authored by Dick Lochte. .
 2010: The Midnight Show Murders. Co-authored by Dick Lochte; nominated for the 2011 Nero Award. .
 2011: The Talk Show Murders. Co-authored by Dick Lochte. .

See also
 Bahamian Americans
 New Yorkers in journalism

References

External links

 
 
 
 Al Roker Investigates at CourtTV.com
 Roker's NBC biography
 Al Roker at Foodnetwork.com
 
 Roker's Favorite Books
 Al's Book Club for Kids
 

1954 births
21st-century American non-fiction writers
African-American game show hosts
African-American television personalities
African-American novelists
American bloggers
American game show hosts
American male novelists
American male voice actors
American mystery writers
American people of Bahamian descent
American people of Jamaican descent
American reporters and correspondents
CNBC people
Daytime Emmy Award winners
Living people
Male actors from New York City
NBC News people
New York (state) television reporters
People from Queens, New York
People from Yorktown, New York
State University of New York at Oswego alumni
Television anchors from Cleveland
Television anchors from New York City
The Weather Channel people
Weather presenters
Novelists from New York (state)
Xavier High School (New York City) alumni
American male non-fiction writers
American male bloggers
African-American Catholics
20th-century African-American people
21st-century African-American writers